Serhiy Sergeyev (born May 25, 1982) is a Ukrainian footballer.

Playing career 
Sergeyev began his career in 2000 with FC Dynamo Lviv in the Ukrainian Second League. In 2002, he signed with FC Karpaty-2 Lviv of the Ukrainian First League, and made the senior team in 2004. Midway through the season he went abroad to Poland to sign with Hetman Zamość. In 2005, he returned to his native country to play with FC Krasyliv, and had stints with MFC Mykolaiv, FC Halychyna Lviv, FC Stal Kamianske, FC Arsenal-Kyivshchyna Bila Tserkva, SC Beregvidek Berehove, and FC Rukh Vynnyky. In 2016, he went overseas to Canada to sign with FC Ukraine United of the Canadian Soccer League. In his debut season he featured in 17 matches and recorded one goal, and helped Ukraine United clinch a postseason berth by finishing second in the standings.

References

External links
 

1982 births
Living people
Footballers from Budapest
Hungarian emigrants to Ukraine
Ukrainian footballers
FC Dynamo Lviv players
FC Karpaty-2 Lviv players
FC Karpaty-3 Lviv players
FC Krasyliv players
MFC Mykolaiv players
FC Halychyna Lviv players
FC Stal Kamianske players
FC Arsenal-Kyivshchyna Bila Tserkva players
SC Beregvidek Berehove players
FC Rukh Lviv players
FC Ukraine United players
Canadian Soccer League (1998–present) players
FC Karpaty Lviv players
Association football midfielders
Ukrainian Second League players
IV liga players